Knoxia is a genus of flowering plants in the family Rubiaceae. The genus is known to be a rich source of anthraquinones.

References

External links

Alseis in the World Checklist of Rubiaceae

Rubiaceae genera
Knoxieae